Pampas District may refer to:

 Pampas District, Huaraz
 Pampas District, Pallasca
 Pampas District, Tayacaja